The Zimní stadion Olomouc is an indoor sporting arena located in Olomouc, Czech Republic. It is currently home to the HC Olomouc ice hockey team. The capacity of the arena is 5,500 people (out of which 3,800 seating) and it was built in 1948 and roofed in 1967.

References

Indoor ice hockey venues in the Czech Republic
Sport in Olomouc
1948 establishments in Czechoslovakia
Sports venues completed in 1948
20th-century architecture in the Czech Republic